Gregory Thomas Frazier (1938–1996) was an American author, professor and Emmy award winner who pioneered the use of audio description in film and TV. He died at age 58 due to cancer. He was the president of the not-for-profit company Audiovision.

References 

Emmy Award winners
1938 births
1996 deaths